Apollonia is a village and a community of the Volvi municipality. Before the 2011 local government reform it was part of the municipality of Madytos, of which it was a municipal district. The 2011 census recorded 316 inhabitants in the village and 490 in the community. The community of Apollonia covers an area of 32.70 km2.

Administrative division
The community of Apollonia consists of two separate settlements: 
Apollonia (population 316)
Kokkalou (population 174)
The aforementioned population figures are from the 2011 census.

See also
 List of settlements in the Thessaloniki regional unit

References

Populated places in Thessaloniki (regional unit)